Fractured Transmitter was a record company started by Jason Popson around the time he departed from Mushroomhead in 2004.

Bands signed
 Pitch Black Forecast
 The Alter Boys
 American Werewolves
 Asleep
 Disengage
 Integrity
 Jeff Walker
 Meshuggah
 State of Conviction
 Bitch Wrangler

See also
 Jason Popson

References

External links
  Official website

Heavy metal record labels